Ķīšezers may refer to:

Ķīšezers, Riga, a lake in Riga, Latvia
Ķīšezers, Kurmene Parish, a lake in Kurmene parish, Latvia
Ķīšezers, Puze Parish, a lake in Puze parish, Latvia